Melissa Ivonne Chaty (born 1984) is an American beauty pageant titleholder from Ukiah, California.  She was Miss Mendocino is 2002, held the titles of Miss Teenage California 2003 and Miss California 2007 and finished in the top 8 at Miss America in 2008.

Biography
Chaty graduated from Westmont College in 2006 with a degree in psychology and  worked for the Alzheimer's Association. Chaty was also Miss Mendocino in 2002, and a top 10 semifinalist for 2003 Miss Teen of Nation. She grew up singing in church and has performed the national anthem for the San Diego Chargers, the Padres, and on TV.

References

1984 births
Living people
People from Ukiah, California
Westmont College alumni
Beauty pageant contestants from California
Miss America 2008 delegates